Group F of the 2022 FIFA World Cup took place from 23 November to 1 December 2022. The group consisted of Belgium, Canada, Morocco and Croatia. The top two teams, Morocco and Croatia, advanced to the round of 16, and later reached the semi-finals. Morocco advanced to the knockout stage for the first time since 1986. By winning the group, they became the first African team to do so since Nigeria in 1998. Belgium failed to advance out of the group round for the first time, also since 1998.

The two teams that progressed out of the group, Croatia and Morocco, eventually faced each other again in the third-place play-off game, with Croatia winning 2–1.

Teams

Notes

Standings

In the round of 16:
 The winners of Group F, Morocco, advanced to play the runners-up of Group E, Spain.
 The runners-up of Group F, Croatia, advanced to play the winners of Group E, Japan.

Matches
All times listed are local, AST (UTC+3).

Morocco vs Croatia
The two teams had faced each other once in a 1996 friendly match, which ended 2–2. They would then go on to play in the 3rd place match, the second straight tournament where the 3rd place match consisted of two teams drawn in the same group.

Belgium vs Canada
The two teams had faced each other once in 1989 in a friendly game, with Belgium winning 2–0. Canada's manager, Englishman John Herdman, became the first manager to coach a team in both the men's and women's World Cup.

Near the end of the first half, Michy Batshuayi scored the only goal of the match following a long-range pass upfield from defender Toby Alderweireld. Despite dominating the game and having 19 attempts on goal, including a penalty kick saved by Thibaut Courtois, Canada could not score.

Belgium vs Morocco
The teams had met in three matches including once in the World Cup, in Belgium's 1–0 group stage victory in 1994.

In the 73rd minute Romain Saïss put Morocco into the lead when he glanced the ball in at close range after a free-kick wide out on the left from Abdelhamid Sabiri deceived Belgian goalkeeper Thibaut Courtois at the near post. Zakaria Aboukhlal made it 2–0 in added time when he finished high to the right corner of the net after a cut-back from Hakim Ziyech on the right. This was the third victory for Morocco in World Cup history.

The Belgian defeat sparked riots back in Belgium, with residents fires and fireworks being set off.

Croatia vs Canada

The two teams had never met before.
Alphonso Davies scored Canada's first-ever World Cup goal with a header in the second minute to give Canada the lead. Goals by Marko Livaja, Lovro Majer and two by Andrej Kramarić for Croatia completed a 4–1 victory.

Croatia vs Belgium
The two teams had faced each other eight times, most recently in 2021, a 1–0 win for Belgium in a friendly game.

Belgium was unable to capitalize in their match against Croatia in a 0–0 draw, which led to their group-stage exit.

Canada vs Morocco
The two teams had faced each other three times, most recently in 2016, in a friendly game, Morocco won 4–0.

Canada and hosts Qatar were the only teams to fail to earn at least a point at this World Cup. Canada remains winless at World Cups with six losses. Nayef Aguerd became the first player to score an own goal in the 2022 World Cup.

Discipline
Fair play points would have been used as tiebreakers if teams' overall and head-to-head records were tied. These were calculated based on yellow and red cards received in all group matches as follows:
first yellow card: −1 point;
indirect red card (second yellow card): −3 points;
direct red card: −4 points;
yellow card and direct red card: −5 points;

Only one of the above deductions was applied to a player in a single match.

References

External links

 

2022 FIFA World Cup
Belgium at the 2022 FIFA World Cup
Canada at the 2022 FIFA World Cup
Morocco at the 2022 FIFA World Cup
Croatia at the 2022 FIFA World Cup